|}

The Fergus O'Toole Memorial Novice Hurdle is a Listed National Hunt novice hurdle race in Ireland which is open to horses aged four years or older. 
It is run at Limerick over a distance of about 2 miles and 5 furlongs (4,224 metres), and it is scheduled to take place each year in October.

The race was first run in 2001 and was awarded Grade 3 status in 2011. It was downgraded to Listed status from 2016.
The race was sponsored by Newenham Mulligan Architects from 2001 to 2009.  It was later named in memory of a local businessman, Fergus O'Toole, who died in 2010. In 2017 and 2018 the race was run as the Dunraven Arms Hotel Novice Hurdle and it was 2019 it was named the Ladbrokes Where The Nation Plays Novice Hurdle. Since 2020 it has been run as the Bluegrass Horse Feed Novice Hurdle.

Records
Most successful jockey (4 wins):
 Ruby Walsh -  Royal Reveille (2011), Zuzka (2012), Indevan (2013), Long Dog (2015)  

Most successful trainer (4 wins): 
 Willie Mullins–  Zuzka (2012), Indevan (2013), Long Dog (2015), Robin Des Foret (2017)

Winners

See also
 Horse racing in Ireland
 List of Irish National Hunt races

References
Racing Post:

National Hunt hurdle races
National Hunt races in Ireland
Limerick Racecourse
Recurring sporting events established in 2001
2001 establishments in Ireland